The Mayor of Maui County is the chief executive officer of the County of Maui in the state of Hawaii. The Mayor has municipal jurisdiction over the islands of Kahoolawe, Lanai, Maui and Molokai. The Mayor of Maui County is the successor of the Royal Governor of Maui of the Kingdom of Hawaii.

The current mayor of Maui County is former Maui County Council member Michael Victorino, who was first elected in November 2018. He was preceded by Alan Arakawa, who was first elected in November 2003, then voted out of office in 2006, and re-elected in 2010. Prominent former mayors include Linda Lingle, the sixth governor of Hawaii and first woman governor, who was mayor from 1991 to 1999.

List of Maui County Mayors

References

Maui